The following is a list of notable people from Jamaica. The list includes some non-resident Jamaicans who were born in Jamaica and also people of predominantly Jamaican heritage.

Artists 

Carl Abrahams, painter
Hope Brooks, painter
John Dunkley, painter and sculptor
Gloria Escoffery, painter and art critic
Laura Facey, sculptor and installation artist
Christopher González, painter and sculptor
Ras Daniel Heartman, artist
Albert Huie, painter
George "Fowokan" Kelly, sculptor
Edna Manley, painter, sculptor and arts educator
Alvin Marriott, sculptor
Ronald Moody, sculptor; Moody crater on Mercury was named after him
Keith Anthony Morrison, painter, printmaker, educator, critic, curator and administrator
Petrona Morrison, sculptor and media artist
Ebony G. Patterson, visual artist and educator
David Pottinger, painter
Mallica Reynolds, painter and sculptor
Margaret Rose Vendryes, multimedia artist
Barrington Watson, painter
Basil Watson, painter and sculptor
Donnette Zacca, fine arts photographer, lecturer, and artist

Beauty contest winners 
Cindy Breakspeare, Miss World 1976
Carole Joan Crawford, Miss World 1965
Lisa Hanna, Miss World 1993, politician
Toni-Ann Singh, Miss World 2019

Business and Law

Alexander Aikman, printer, publisher, and landowner
Chris Blackwell, president and CEO of Island Records and Palm Pictures, NYC
Morris Cargill, lawyer and businessman
G. Raymond Chang, co-founder of CI Financial and the third chancellor of Ryerson University
Alexandra Chong, founder and CEO of Jacana
Gloria Cumper, barrister, the first black woman to study at the University of Cambridge
Jak Beula Dodd, entrepreneur and inventor of the board game Nubian Jak
Wilfred Emmanuel-Jones, businessman, farmer and founder of "The Black Farmer" range of food products
Renatha Francis, circuit Judge in Palm Beach County, Florida
Claudia L. Gordon, lawyer, the first deaf black female attorney in the United States
GraceKennedy Limited
Ephraim and Lowell Hawthorne, founders of Golden Krust Caribbean Bakery
Joseph John Issa, founder of Cool Group
Michael Lee-Chin, Chairman/CEO of AIC Limited, Chairman of NCB Jamaica
Henry Lowe, owns and manages a variety of businesses in the health industry
Val McCalla, accountant and media entrepreneur; he is the founder of The Voice, a British weekly newspaper aimed at the Britain's black community
Caroline Newman, entrepreneur and the first black solicitor to be elected to the Council of the Law Society of England and Wales
Philip Ernest Housden Pike, barrister and judge who served as the second Chief Justice of Borneo
Heather Rabbatts, businesswoman, solicitor and broadcaster; became the youngest council chief in the UK and was the first ethnic minority person to serve as a Football Association director
Patrick Lipton Robinson, member of the International Court of Justice 
Tracy Robinson, lawyer and lecturer in the Faculty of Law at the University of the West Indies 
Lascelles Robotham, lawyer and Chief Justice of the Eastern Caribbean Supreme Court 
Levi Roots, Chairman of Reggae Reggae Sauce
David P. Rowe, lawyer
Jewel Scott, first woman and first Caribbean-American District Attorney for Clayton County
Adam Stewart
Gordon "Butch" Stewart  
George Stiebel, trader and entrepreneur who became Jamaica's first black millionaire
Tom Tavares-Finson, lawyer
Gail Vaz-Oxlade, financial adviser, TV personality
Walkerswood Caribbean Foods
James S. Watson, one of the first Black Americans elected as a judge in the state of New York
Dame Sharon White, businesswoman and Second Permanent Secretary at HM Treasury from 2013 to 2015 She was the first black person, and the second woman, to become a Permanent Secretary at the UK HM Treasury
Damian Williams, first African-American U.S. attorney for the Southern District of New York

Groups
Black Uhuru, Grammy Award winners
Bob Marley and the Wailers
Byron Lee and the Dragonaires
Culture
Inner Circle
Morgan Heritage, Grammy Award winners
The Pioneers
Skatalites, Ska Band
Sly and Robbie
Third World
T.O.K., a crew of deejays
Toots and the Maytals, double Grammy Award Winners

Journalists, poets and writers

Opal Palmer Adisa, writer
Louisa Wells Aikman, writer
Gwyneth Barber Wood, poet
Edward Baugh, poet
Lindsay Barrett, writer, playwright, journalist
Louise Bennett-Coverley, poet
Evon Blake, journalist
Barbara Blake Hannah, author and journalist. She was the first black person to be an on-camera reporter and interviewer on British television
Jean "Binta" Breeze, poet
Erna Brodber, novelist
Charles Hopel Brown, writer, author
Lady Colin Campbell, writer, socialite
Morris Cargill, journalist
Margaret Cezair-Thompson, novelist
Colin Channer, novelist, co-founder of Calabash
Staceyann Chin, poet and writer
Michelle Cliff, writer
Aston Cooke, playwright, artistic director
Carolyn Cooper, writer and cultural theorist
Christine Craig, poet and short story writer
Patricia Cumper, playwright
Kwame Dawes, Ghana-born writer, co-founder of Calabash
Jean D'Costa, professor, linguist, and children's novelist
Ferdinand Dennis, writer, broadcaster, journalist and lecturer
Nicole Dennis-Benn, novelist
John Figueroa, poet
Ryan Fraser, writer
Malcolm Gladwell, writer, journalist
Thomas Glave, Bronx-born writer
Lorna Goodison, writer
Hubert Henry Harrison, writer, philosopher
Victor Headley, author
John Hearne, novelist
Perry Henzell, writer, director
Marlon James, novelist
Vere Johns, writer, broadcaster, actor
Linton Kwesi Johnson, dub poet
Roger Mais, novelist
Louis Marriott, playwright, actor, director, journalist
Una Marson, writer, broadcaster
Claude McKay, writer
Alecia McKenzie, writer
Anthony McNeill, poet
Brian Meeks, novelist
Kei Miller, writer
Pamela Mordecai, poet
Mervyn Morris, poet
Mutabaruka, poet
Oku Onuora, writer
Geoffrey Philp, writer
Patricia Powell, novelist
Claudia Rankine, poet
Barry Reckord, playwright
Victor Stafford Reid, writer
Leone Ross, novelist, editor, short story writer, journalist, academic
Andrew Salkey, writer
Dennis Scott, poet and playwright
Olive Senior, writer
Malachi Smith, poet
Pamela Colman Smith, artist and writer
Michael Thelwell, writer
Vivian Virtue, poet
Sylvia Wynter, writer
Kerry Young, author

Models
Tyson Beckford, model
Carla Campbell, model
Naomi Campbell, model
Winnie Harlow, model
Grace Jones, model, musician, actress
Venice Kong, Playboy playmate
Stacey McKenzie, supermodel, actress and model coach
Rachel Stuart, model, television personality
Karin Taylor, former Playboy model

Musicians, actors and film-makers

Aidonia, dancehall, rap deejay
DJ Akademiks, blogger
Alaine, singer
Monty Alexander, jazz pianist and composer
Cherine Anderson, singer, actress, director
Esther Anderson, actress, film-maker, photographer
Buju Banton, reggae singer
Roxanne Beckford, actress and producer
Beenie Man, deejay; Grammy winner
Thom Bell, musician, singer-songwriter, arranger and producer
Barbara Blake Hannah, film-maker, festival organiser
Bounty Killer, reggae musician
Carl Bradshaw, actor, film producer
Yvonne Brewster, actress, theatre director
Brigadier Jerry, reggae musician, dancehall deejay
Dennis Brown, reggae singer
Burning Spear, real name Winston Rodney, reggae musician
Busy Signal, dancehall and reggae musician deejay
Canibus, rapper
Charlie Chaplin, reggae singer
Clive Chin, record producer
Tessanne Chin, singer-songwriter, winner of NBC's The Voice Season 5 in 2013
Vincent "Randy" Chin, record producer, co-founder of VP Records
Chipmunk, rapper, songwriter
Chubb Rock, rapper, radio personality
Tami Chynn, singer-songwriter
Jimmy Cliff, singer, reggae musician
Count Ossie, Rastafari Drummer and band leader
Patricia Cumper, producer, director, theatre administrator, critic and commentator
Desmond Dekker, ska and reggae singer
Demarco, reggae and dancehall musician
Coxsone Dodd, record producer
Clancy Eccles, ska and reggae singer, record producer
Eek-a-Mouse, reggae singer
Elephant Man, reggae singer
Horace Faith, reggae singer
Chuck Fenda, singer
Honor Ford-Smith, actress, playwright, poet
Dean Fraser, reggae musician
Kirk Fraser, film director, film producer, screenwriter
Ghetts, grime MC
Joe Gibbs, record producer
Andrew Gourlay, conductor
Mona Hammond, actress
Dahlia Harris, actress and television personality
Heavy D, rapper
Sean Paul Henriques, dancehall musician
Toots Hibbert, reggae musician
Joseph Hill, reggae musician and band leader, Culture
Deni Hines, singer
Marcia Hines, singer
Stephen Hopkins, film director
Giggs, rapper
Grace Jones, singer and actress
K-Anthony, gospel singer
Ini Kamoze, reggae musician
Kano, rapper, actor
Koffee, reggae musician 
Vybz Kartel, dancehall musician, rapper, deejay
Wynton Kelly, jazz pianist
Joseph Hoo Kim, record producer
Diana King, reggae musician
King Tubby, dub musician
Sean Kingston, singer
Sean Paul, singer
Kiprich, deejay
DJ Kool Herc, DJ
Major Lazer, DJ 
Byron Lee, ska and soca musician
Rusty Lee, actress, singer, television personality
Barrington Levy, reggae singer
Mad Cobra, dancehall deejay
Bob Marley, reggae singer
Damian Marley, reggae musician
Ky-Mani Marley, reggae musician
Rita Marley, reggae singer; wife of Bob Marley
Stephen Marley, singer
Ziggy Marley, reggae musician; son of Bob Marley 
Mavado, dancehall and reggae musician
Winston McAnuff, Reggae and Dub singer and composer aka Electric Dread
Carmen McRae, singer
Mr. Vegas, deejay
Hugh Mundell, reggae singer-songwriter
Augustus Pablo, reggae singer
Patra, dancehall musician
Dawn Penn, reggae singer
Lee "Scratch" Perry, reggae musician
Leigh-Anne Pinnock, singer
Prince Buster, ska singer and producer
Ernest Ranglin, jazz, ska, rocksteady and reggae guitarist
Ras Droppa, reggae artist
Lloyd Reckord, actor, producer, director, playwright
Duke Reid, record producer
Wayne Rhoden, singer-songwriter
Tarrus Riley, singer
Tenor Saw, reggae artist 
Sasha, deejay
Lady Saw, reggae musician
Serani, reggae singer
Shabba Ranks, reggae musician
Shaggy, singer-songwriter
Shenseea, rapper
Madge Sinclair, Emmy winning actress                                                                                                                                                                                                                                                                                                                                                                                                                      
Sister Nancy, dancehall deejay
Sizzla, reggae and dancehall deejay
Millie Small, singer-songwriter
Mikey Smith, dub poet
Spice, dancehall musician
Spot
Spragga Benz, reggae and dancehall deejay
Neville Staple, singer
Peter Tosh, reggae musician
Ruby Turner, singer-songwriter and actress
Bunny Wailer, reggae singer
Willard White, operatic bass-baritone
Peter Williams, actor
Wretch 32, rapper
Tyga, rapper
Stefflon Don, rapper
Yellowman, reggae and dancehall deejay

Politicians
Kenneth Baugh, Minister of Health and Deputy Prime Minister
 Barbara Blake-Hannah, first Rastafarian representative in the Jamaican parliament
Alexander Bustamante, trade unionist and Prime Minister, national hero
Bruce Golding, Prime Minister
Lisa Hanna, Minister of Youth & Culture, former Miss World
Andrew Holness, Prime Minister
Hyman Isaac Long, Deputy Inspector General of the Grand Consistory of the twenty-five degree "Rite of the Royal Secret" (11 January 1795)
Michael Manley, Prime Minister
Norman Manley, Prime Minister and Jamaican national hero
Earle Maynier, first Jamaican High Commissioner to Canada
Henry Moore, colonial governor
Trevor Munroe, trade unionist and politician
P. J. Patterson, Prime Minister
Edward Seaga, Prime Minister
Portia Simpson-Miller, Prime Minister
Tom Tavares-Finson, President of the Senate of Jamaica.

Religious leaders
S. U. Hastings, first Jamaican bishop of the Moravian Church
 Rev Rose Josephine Hudson-Wilkin, Bishop of Dover and the first black woman to become a Church of England bishop. She was the first black female to hold the role of Queen's Chaplain. She also served as Chaplain to the Speaker of the House of Commons from 2010 to 2019
 Oliver Lyseight, the founder of one of Britain's largest black majority churches, and spiritual leader to the "Windrush generation"
Neville Neil, bishop of the Moravian Church in Jamaica

Science and medicine
Evan Dale Abel, Jamaican-born endocrinologist
Maydianne Andrade, Jamaican-born Canadian ecologist.
Simone Badal-McCreath, Jamaican chemist and cancer researcher
Walt Braithwaite, Jamaican-born American engineer and former executive at Boeing.
Aggrey Burke, Jamaican-born psychiatrist and the first black consultant psychiatrist appointed by Britain's National Health Service (NHS)
Nira Chamberlain, mathematician and the first black mathematician to join the exclusive list of distinguish living British mathematicians who feature in the biographical reference book Who’s Who. He is also the creator of a mathematical cost capability trade-off model for HMS Queen Elizabeth
Paul R. Cunningham, Jamaican-born surgeon and medical educator 
Patricia Daley, Jamaican-born British human geographer and academic
Patricia DeLeon, Jamaican reproductive geneticist who specialists in the male reproductive system
Tashni-Ann Dubroy, Jamaican science academic and university administrator in the United States
Kevin Fenton, epidemiologist and a regional director at Public Health England
Yvette Francis-McBarnette, Jamaican-born paediatrician
Bertram Fraser-Reid, Jamaican synthetic organic chemist  
Neil Gardner, Jamaican chiropractic neurologist, former athlete
Thomas J. Goreau, Jamaican biogeochemist and marine biologist;
Neil Hanchard, Jamaican physician and clinical investigator 
Odette Harris, Jamaican-born professor of neurosurgery at Stanford University and the Director of the Brain Injury Program for the Stanford University School of Medicine. 
Jacqueline Hughes-Oliver, Jamaican-born statistician 
Hedley Jones, Jamaican audio engineer and astronomer 
Thomas Lecky, Jamaican scientist who developed several new breeds of cattle 
Elsa Leo-Rhynie, Jamaican science academic 
Henry Lowe, Jamaican scientist, philanthropist and businessman
Camille McKayle, Jamaican-born mathematician
Harold Moody, Jamaican physician
Ludlow Moody, Jamaican physician
Errol Morrison, Jamaican scientist who has carried out pioneering work in the field of diabetes
Karen E. Nelson, Jamaican-born American microbiologist,
Geoff Palmer, Jamaican-born scientist
Donald Richards, statistician 
Mercedes Richards, Jamaican-born  pioneering astronomy and astrophysics professor.
Robert Robinson, Jamaican-born engineer
Mary Seacole, Jamaican-born woman of Scottish and Creole descent who set up a "British hotel" behind the lines during the Crimean War
Jean Springer, Jamaican mathematics professor 
Garth Taylor, Jamaican ophthalmologist, professor, and humanitarian
Manley West, Jamaican pharmacologist who developed a treatment for  glaucoma
Cicely Williams, identified the protein deficiency disease kwashiorkor
Henry Vernon Wong, Jamaican-American physicist known for his work in plasma physics.

Sports

Alia Atkinson, OD, multiple time Olympic swimmer
Donovan Bailey, Jamaican-born Canadian, world champion sprinter
Leon Bailey, Jamaican footballer playing for Aston Villa FC
John Barnes, Jamaican-born English football player; played for the England national football team and Liverpool F.C.
Trevor Berbick, champion boxer 
Atari Bigby, former football player
Andre Blake, professional MLS goalkeeper 
Yohan Blake, sprinter
Usain Bolt, world and Olympic record holder, 100m and 200m
Walter Boyd, former professional footballer
Steve Bucknor, international cricket umpire
Veronica Campbell-Brown, sprinter
Alicia Ashley, former women's boxing champion
Omar Cummings, Jamaican-born MLS and Jamaica national football team football player
Chili Davis, Jamaican-born American, former star Major League Baseball player
Patrick Ewing, Jamaican-born American, former NBA star
 Junior Flemmings, professional footballer
Heather Foster, Jamaican-born American professional bodybuilder
Shaun Francis, former professional footballer
Shelly-Ann Fraser-Pryce, sprinter, 100m and 200m World and Olympic record holder (Beijing 2008 and London 2012), fondly known as "The Pocket Rocket"
Ricardo Fuller, Jamaican-born Premier League and Jamaica national football team football player
Ricardo Gardner, Jamaican-born Premier League and Jamaica national football team football player
Chris Gayle, Captain of West Indian International Cricket Team
Ian Goodison, former professional footballer
Owayne Gordon, professional footballer
George Headley, cricketer
Sek Henry, basketball player
Wavell Hinds, cricketer
Michael Holding, cricketer
Shericka Jackson, Olympic medalist 
Kamara James, Jamaican-born American, Olympic fencer
Ben Johnson, Jamaican-born Canadian, disgraced champion sprinter
Glen Johnson, champion boxer
Ryan Johnson, former professional footballer
Jerome Jordan, NBA player, New York Knicks center #44
Andrew Kennedy, professional basketball player
Rajiv Maragh, jockey
Tyrone Marshall, Jamaican-born MLS and Jamaica national football team football player
Darren Mattocks, Jamaican-born MLS and Jamaica national football team football player
Mike McCallum, champion boxer
Merlene Ottey, Jamaican-born Slovenian sprinter, the world's most winning female athlete
Asafa Powell, sprinter, former 100m world record holder
Donald Quarrie, sprinter
Shawn Rhoden, bodybuilder
Sanya Richards-Ross, Jamaican-born American sprinter, 400m
Donovan Ricketts, Jamaican-born MLS and Jamaica national football team football player
Tessa Sanderson, Jamaican-born former British Javelin gold medalist and Heptathlon
Trecia-Kaye Smith, former Triple Jump World Champion
Raheem Sterling, Jamaican-born English football player; currently plays for Manchester City
Shavar Thomas, Jamaican-born MLS and Jamaica national football team football player
Elaine Thompson-Herah, OD, multiple Olympic champion
Stephen Tulloch, National Football League middle linebacker for Detroit Lions and N.C. State Wolfpac; born in Miami of Jamaican heritage
Peter-Lee Vassell, professional footballer
Melaine Walker, sprinter, 400m Olympic record holder (Beijing 2008)
Courtney Walsh, cricketer
Nicholas Walters, professional boxer, former WBA (Super) World Featherweight champion
Devon White, baseball player
Theodore Whitmore, former professional footballer, coach
Arthur Wint, OD MBE, Olympic former 400m gold medalist

Others
 Diane Abbott, first female member of the African-Caribbean community to be elected to the UK House of Commons in 1987
 Hope Arthurine Anderson, national chess champion and Olympian
 Emily Rose Bleby (1849-1917), temperance reformer
Dawn Butler, Labour MP since 2015. Butler became the first black woman to speak from the despatch box in the House of Commons in December 2009
Alan Eyre, geographer and environmentalist
Michael Fuller, Britain's first black Police Chief Constable and Chief Inspector of the Crown Prosecution Service
 Marcus Garvey, founder of the Universal Negro Improvement Association (UNIA)
 St. William Grant, trade unionist and activist
 Henry Gunter, civil rights campaigner, trade unionist and the first black delegate to be elected to the Birmingham Trades Council
Stuart Hall, cultural theorist, political activist and co-founder of New Left Review
 Thomas Duffus Hardy, archivist and antiquary
Donald J. Harris, economist
Lenford "Steve" Harvey, AIDS activist
Barrington Irving, pilot who previously held the record for the youngest person to pilot a plane around the world solo
Baroness Lawrence, campaigner
Ian McKnight, founder of Jamaica AIDS Support for LIFE (JASL)
Bill Morris, General Secretary of the Transport and General Workers' Union from 1992 to 2003, and became the first black leader of a major British trade union.
Colin Powell, politician, statesman, diplomat, and United States Army officer who served as the 65th United States Secretary of State from 2001 to 2005. He was the first African-American Secretary of State
 Roxroy Salmon, Jamaican-American immigration activist

See also
List of Jamaican British people
List of Jamaican Americans
List of Jamaican Jews

References